Marc Torsten Politze (born 20 October 1977 in Hannover) is a German male former water polo player. He was part of the Germany men's national water polo team in the 2004 Summer Olympics and in the 2008 Summer Olympics. He competed also at the 2011 World Aquatics Championships.

References

1977 births
Living people
German male water polo players
Place of birth missing (living people)
Olympic water polo players of Germany
Water polo players at the 2004 Summer Olympics
Water polo players at the 2008 Summer Olympics
Sportspeople from Hanover